Eilema pseudocretacea is a moth of the subfamily Arctiinae. It is found on Borneo. The habitat consists of lower montane forests.

The length of the forewings is 13–14 mm. The fore- and hindwings are powdery bone-coloured.

References

Moths described in 2001
pseudocretacea